The Second Battle of Lincoln occurred at Lincoln Castle on Saturday 20 May 1217, during the First Barons' War, between the forces of the future Louis VIII of France and those of King Henry III of England. Louis's forces were attacked by a relief force under the command of William Marshal, 1st Earl of Pembroke. Thomas, Count of Perche, commanding the French troops, was killed and Louis was expelled from his base in the southeast of England. The looting that took place afterwards is known as the "Lincoln Fair". The citizens of Lincoln were loyal to Louis so Henry's forces sacked the city.

Background
In 1216, during the First Barons' War over the English succession, Prince Louis of France entered London and proclaimed himself King of England. Louis was supported by various English barons who resisted the rule of King John. John died in the middle of the war, and his nine-year-old son Henry III was crowned King of England as successor to his father.

Once John died, many barons were willing to change sides and fight for Henry against Prince Louis' claim. William Marshal, 1st Earl of Pembroke, a knight of great skill and prowess, served as regent for Henry. Marshal called all nobles holding castles in England to a muster in Newark. Approximately 400 knights, 250 crossbowmen, and a larger auxiliary force of both mounted and foot soldiers were assembled. Marshal marched his forces to the city of Lincoln to break Prince Louis's siege.

Battlefield
Medieval Lincoln was an ancient walled city with a Norman castle near its centre, straddling the crossroads of two important Roman-built highways: Ermine Street and the Fosse Way. These trans-England routes were historic and major arteries for national trade and government, making Lincoln a strategic location. William the Conqueror had ordered the construction of Lincoln Castle on a hilltop over an old Roman fort 150 years earlier.

At the time of the battle in May 1217, Louis's forces had taken the city of Lincoln, but Lincoln Castle remained intact. Its garrison, commanded by castellan Nichola de la Haye, was loyal to King Henry and continued to defend the important fortification from forces loyal to Prince Louis, led by Thomas, the Count of Perche.

Battle
Marshal's forces made their approach from the town of Stow, a few miles northwest of Lincoln. The advance was known to Thomas, Count of Perche, but his knights were uncertain as to the enemy's strength. Two strategies were formed. Those who believed Marshal's force was relatively small in number favoured an offensive plan: a meeting in an open battlefield at the base of the hill, before Marshal could reach the city gates. Those who believed Marshal had a dangerously large force favoured a more defensive plan: delay Marshal at the gates of the city wall, and at the same time press the siege, capture the castle, and occupy this much stronger position. The defensive plan was taken, though not without some continuing dissension.

Marshal proceeded to the section of the city walls nearest the castle, at the north gate. All of Marshal's crossbowmen, led by the nobleman Falkes de Breauté, assaulted and took the gate. Perche's forces did not respond, but continued the castle siege.

Marshal's main force secured the north gate, while Breauté's crossbowmen took up high positions on the rooftops of houses. Volleys of bolts from this high ground rained death, damage and confusion on Perche's forces. Then, in the final blow, Marshal's knights and footsoldiers charged Perche's siege forces. Perche was offered a surrender, but fought to the death as the siege collapsed into a scattered rout. Those of Louis's army who were not captured fled Lincoln, by the south city gate, to London. The battle took about six hours.

Aftermath and effects
The city of Lincoln was pillaged by Marshal's victorious army, on the pretence that it was loyal to Louis, later euphemistically called 'the Lincoln Fair'. To the south, inhabitants of towns between Lincoln and London ambushed and killed some of the escaping French soldiers on their flight south to London.

The Battle of Lincoln was the turning point in the First Barons' War. Many of Henry's enemies – barons who had supported Louis, and who helped supply, organise and command Louis's military forces – were captured at Lincoln. French reinforcements, under the command of Eustace the Monk, were then sent across the English Channel to bolster Louis's forces. The French ships were defeated by Hubert de Burgh in the Battle of Dover. This defeat greatly reduced the French threat to the English crown and Prince Louis and his remaining forces returned to France. In September 1217, the Treaty of Lambeth forced Louis to give up his claim to the English throne and to eject Eustace's brothers from the Channel Islands.

See also
 Battle of Lincoln (1141)
 Magna Carta
 William Marshal
 First Barons' War
 Lincoln Castle
 Nicola de la Haye

Notes

References
 
 The Battle of Lincoln (1217), according to Roger of Wendover.
 Freeman, Edward Augustus. The History of the Norman Conquest of England: Its Causes and Its Results. Clarendon Press. Oxford: 1879. p719
 Lincoln: A city on top of the world
 Lincoln Castle
 

Lincoln 1217
1217 in England
Lincoln 1217
History of Lincoln, England
Lincoln 1217